Maartje Offers (27 February 1891, Koudekerk (aan den Rijn) – 28 January 1944, Tholen) was a Dutch contralto classical singer.

Recordings 
 Het Puik van zoete kelen (The Cream of Glorious Voices) Philips Dutch Masters 464 385-2 Songs include "Where Corals Lie" from Elgar's Sea Pictures.
 Lebendige Vergangenheit Preiser Records 2916777
 Maartje Offers, contralto cd1: The Opera Recordings 1923-1927 - DDR 0703
 Maartje Offers, contralto cd2: The Lied & Song recordings, 1926-1930 - DDR 0704

External links 
 Dutch Divas Maartje Offers biography (English)
 Discography
 Dutch Divas Maartje Offers biography (Dutch / Flemish)
 Maartje Offers (Contralto)
 Dutch contraltos
 Biografie van Offers, Maartje from Biografisch Woordenboek van Nederland (Dutch / Flemish)

1891 births
1944 deaths
20th-century Dutch women opera singers
Operatic contraltos
People from Koudekerk aan den Rijn